Incurso is the third and final studio album by the Swedish death metal band Spawn of Possession, released in 2012. The album title is Latin for "I raid" or "I attack." It features two new band members, Christian Münzner on lead guitars and Erlend Caspersen on bass. The album has received very positive responses from fans and critics alike, as it is widely regarded as the best Spawn of Possession album up to date. Most of the positives went to describe how "Incurso is one of the rare highly technical albums that stay interesting and makes the listener to pay attention from the first to the last minute."

Track listing

Credits
 Dennis Röndum - vocals
 Jonas Bryssling - guitar
 Christian Münzner - guitar
 Erlend Caspersen - bass
 Henrik Schönström - drums

Additional personnel
 Jonas Karlsson - guitar solo on "No Light Spared"

References

2012 albums
Spawn of Possession albums
Relapse Records albums
Albums with cover art by Pär Olofsson